Broadway – My Way is a studio album by Nancy Wilson released in March 1963 on Capitol Records. The album reached No. 18 on the Billboard 200 chart.

Track listing 
 "A Lot of Livin' to Do" (Lee Adams, Charles Strouse) – 2:08
 "You Can Have Him" (Irving Berlin) – 4:42
 "Tonight" (Leonard Bernstein, Stephen Sondheim) – 2:33
 "Make Someone Happy" (Betty Comden, Adolph Green, Jule Styne) – 3:17
 "I Believe in You" (Frank Loesser) – 2:02
 "As Long as He Needs Me" (Lionel Bart) – 2:29
 "Getting to Know You" (Oscar Hammerstein II, Richard Rodgers) – 2:35
 "My Ship" (Ira Gershwin, Kurt Weill) – 3:14
 "The Sweetest Sounds" (Rodgers) – 2:04
 "Joey, Joey, Joey" (Loesser) – 3:56
 "Loads of Love" (Rodgers) – 2:12
 "I'll Know" (Loesser) – 2:31
 Bonus tracks not included on the original 1964 release:
 "Hello, Young Lovers" (Hammerstein, Rodgers) – 2:07
 "If Ever I Would Leave You" (Alan Jay Lerner, Frederick Loewe) – 2:57
 "I'm All Smiles" (Michael Leonard, Herbert Martin) – 1:45
 "Come Back to Me" (Burton Lane, Lerner) – 2:35
 "Don't Rain on My Parade" (Bob Merrill, Styne) – 2:12

Personnel 
 Nancy Wilson – vocals
 Don Fagerquist – trumpet
 Lew McCreary – trombone
 Buddy Collette – saxophone
 Bill Perkins – saxophone
 Paul Horn – reeds
 John Michael Gray – guitar
 Joe Comfort – double bass
 Lou Levy – piano
 Kenny Dennis – drums
 Emil Richards – percussion
 Gerald Wilson – arranger, conductor
 Jimmy Jones – piano
 Milt Raskin – conductor, orchestration
 George Shearing – arranger, string arrangements

References 

1963 albums
Nancy Wilson (jazz singer) albums
Albums produced by Dave Cavanaugh
Capitol Records albums
Albums arranged by Gerald Wilson
Albums conducted by Gerald Wilson
Albums conducted by Milt Raskin
Albums arranged by George Shearing